James Hiroji Wakatsuki (August 1929 – September 22, 1992) was a Japanese American politician and a justice of the Supreme Court of Hawaii from September 7, 1983 to September 22, 1992. His nickname was "The Opihi", after the well-known, difficult to move, mollusk.

Early life and education
Wakatsuki was born in August 1929 in Kalihi, a district of Honolulu, Hawaii to immigrants from Japan. He studied at Farrington High School and the University of Hawaiʻi. He joined the U.S. Army partway through his university studies, enlisting from 1948 to 1949. After leaving the army, Wakatsuki finished his degree at Bowling Green University. In 1954, Wakatsuki  graduated from the University of Wisconsin Law School.

Career
In 1955, Wakatsuki worked at the Renegotiation office in Washington DC. He then worked as a clerk at the Hawaii Territorial Legislature. Wakatsuki opened a law office in Kalihi in 1957.

Wakatsuki was elected to the Territorial House of Representatives in 1958. By 1975 he was the Speaker of the House and had gained the nickname "The Opihi" because once he took a position, he would not budge, much like the difficult to move mollusk. During his time in office, Wakatsuki also maintained his law office and did community service with the Kalihi YMCA and the Lions Club. He was also president of the Honolulu Junior Japanese Chamber of Commerce.

He retired from politics in 1980 after being appointed the Hawaii State Circuit Court judge by George Ariyoshi. Wakatsuki was nominated for a seat on the Supreme Court of Hawaii in 1983. Prosecutor Charles Marsland criticized Wakatsuki's legal and political experience, but he was confirmed by the Senate and joined the Supreme Court on September 7, 1983.

Personal life
In 1953, Wakatsuki married Irene Yoshimura. They had three children.

Wakatsuki died of liver failure while in office on September 22, 1992.

References

1929 births
1992 deaths
20th-century American politicians
20th-century American judges
People from Honolulu
University of Hawaiʻi at Mānoa alumni
Bowling Green State University alumni
University of Michigan Law School alumni
Justices of the Hawaii Supreme Court
Members of the Hawaii House of Representatives
Members of the Hawaii Territorial Legislature